Chris Woodruff (born January 3, 1973) is an American former professional tennis player and current head coach at the University of Tennessee. He won the 1997 Canada Masters, reached the quarterfinals of the 2000 Australian Open and attained a career-high ranking of world No. 29 in August 1997.

He hails from Knoxville, Tennessee and was trained at the Knoxville Racquet Club. Since 2002, he has served as an assistant coach with the University of Tennessee men's tennis program, before being named the head coach on May 19, 2017.

College career
Woodruff attended the hometown University of Tennessee where in 1993 he won the NCAA single's title by defeating Wade McGuire of Georgia. He remains the only individual champion the school has ever had. He was also an All-American in 1992.

After winning the collegiate crown, Woodruff began his professional career.

Professional career
Woodruff won two singles titles during his career, and his first was also his biggest: The Canadian Open in 1997, an ATP Masters Series event. After winning that title he posted the highest ranking of his career: World No. 29 on August 25, 1997. He also won the 1999 Newport, Rhode Island event at the Tennis Hall of Fame.

He was named to the United States Davis Cup team in 2000, joining Andre Agassi after Pete Sampras and Todd Martin both were forced to drop out, and won his match against Wayne Black to help erase a 2–1 deficit and advance to the second round. He reached the quarterfinals at the Australian Open in the year 2000 before losing to Pete Sampras in straight sets.

Coaching career
In the summer of 2002, Woodruff returned to the University of Tennessee as a volunteer assistant coach. He served first as an assistant tennis coach before being promoted to associate head coach in 2006 when Sam Winterbotham was hired as head coach. Since Woodruff has been back at Tennessee, the Vols have had 18 All-America and 29 All-Southeastern Conference selections.

Tennessee has steadily improved their record and ranking since Woodruff and Winterbotham began coaching together. The Vols have won 178 dual matches in their first eight seasons and have ended the year ranked in the top 10 nationally five of those years. In 2010, the Vols won the Southeastern Conference regular season and tournament titles and also reached the NCAA Tennis Championship final for the third time in program history. The team finished with 31 victories, the second-most in a season in Tennessee history.

Woodruff was named the 2013 National Assistant Coach of the Year by the Intercollegiate Tennis Association for his track record of player development and keeping the Vols ranked in the top 10 for five of the last six seasons. Since 2008, he has been responsible for coaching three players to the No. 1 national singles ranking: John-Patrick Smith (2010), Rhyne Williams (2011) and Mikelis Libietis (2013).

In 2014, Woodruff served as the on-court coach for the Vols' first NCAA doubles title in 34 years. Libietis and Hunter Reese defeated Ohio State's Peter Kobelt and Kevin Metka in the final.

Career finals

Singles: 4 (2 titles, 2 runner-ups)

Doubles: 3 (3 runner-ups)

ATP Challenger and ITF Futures finals

Singles: 4 (2–2)

Doubles: 9 (4–5)

Performance timelines

Singles

Doubles

References

External links
 
 
 

1973 births
Living people
American male tennis players
Sportspeople from Knoxville, Tennessee
Tennis people from Tennessee
Tennessee Volunteers men's tennis players